Stephanie Angela Maxwell is an animator, filmmaker and Professor Emeritus in the School of Film and Animation at the Rochester Institute of Technology. She specializes in hand-painted experimental abstract animation. Her techniques include direct-on-film painting, motion painting, object animation, copier techniques, and live action manipulation. Most of her works are collaborations with composers.

Stephanie Maxwell's works have been presented in many international festivals and solo retrospectives, including the Northwest Film Forum, the Downtown Los Angeles Film Festival, and the Ottawa International Animation Festival. She was co-founder and co-director for 12 years of the ImageMovementSound festivals, an annual festival of collaborative productions by interdisciplinary artists.

Works
Stephanie Maxwell's films include:
Aquarium (2018), Aquarium by Camille Saint-Saëns, arranged by Max Berlin 
River (2015), composer Tom Davis
Ocean (2014), composer Michaela Eremiasova
Marimba Quartet (2014), composer Michael Burritt
tzzzz! (2010), composer Yuya Takeda
Currents (2008), a collaborative work with Michaela Eremiasova and Jairo Duarte-Lopez
Time Streams (2003), a collaborative work with composer Allan Schindler
Nocturne (1999), a collaborative work with composer Greg Wilder
Driving Abstractions (1997), composer Bill Haslett

Publications
"Why I work direct on film", Animation, vol. 7, spring 1999

References

External links
"The Animation Pimp: Unsung Animators #3: Riding with Stephanie Maxwell", Animation World Network
Please Don't Stop (1989) on YouTube
Fragments (2000) on YouTube
Runa's Spell (2007) on YouTube
Stephanie Maxwell's homepage

Abstract animation
American animators
American film directors
American animated film directors
American women film directors
Rochester Institute of Technology faculty
Living people
American women animators
Year of birth missing (living people)
American women academics
21st-century American women